Fumiyo (written: 史代 or 文世) is a unisex Japanese given name. Notable people with the name include:

, Japanese manga artist
, Japanese actor
, Japanese dancer, actress and choreographer
, Japanese triple jumper
, Japanese table tennis player

Japanese unisex given names